Hollanda is a genus of small ground birds known from fossils found in the Barun Goyot Formation of Mongolia. Found at Khermeen Tsav, it dates from the late Cretaceous period (Campanian stage), about 75 million years ago. Known only from partial hind limbs, Hollanda has long legs with an unusual configuration of the toes. These indicate that it was a fast-running ground bird, possibly similar to the modern Roadrunner. Its relationships are uncertain. Some studies have found that it was an relatively advanced bird, a member of the Ornithurae, related to birds like Ichthyornis. Other studies have recovered it as a member of the primitive family Songlingornithidae. A more expansive study found it as an enantiornithean.Dinosaur Institute at the Natural History Museum of Los Angeles County project lead and researcher, Alyssa Bell, named the new species after the Holland family (donors to the project) and the rock band Lucero.

References

Late Cretaceous birds of Asia
Fossil taxa described in 2010
Prehistoric avialans